Pedro Palm is a Dutch mixed martial artist. He competed in the Heavyweight division.

Mixed martial arts record

|-
| Loss
| align=center| 2-5 (1)
| Can Sahinbas
| TKO
| IMA: Mix Fight Gala
| 
| align=center| 0
| align=center| 0:00
| Landsmeer, North Holland, Netherlands
| 
|-
| Loss
| align=center| 2-4 (1)
| Sander MacKilljan
| KO (knee)
| Rings Holland: The King of Rings
| 
| align=center| 1
| align=center| 2:13
| North Holland, Netherlands
| 
|-
| Loss
| align=center| 2-3 (1)
| Oleg Tsygolnik
| Submission (rear naked choke)
| M-1 MFC: World Championship 1997
| 
| align=center| 1
| align=center| 0:57
| St. Petersburg, Russia
| 
|-
| Loss
| align=center| 2-2 (1)
| Gilbert Yvel
| TKO
| Gym Alkmaar: Fight Gala
| 
| align=center| 0
| align=center| 0:00
| Netherlands
| 
|-
| Loss
| align=center| 2-1 (1)
| Joop Kasteel
| KO (palm strikes)
| Rings Holland: Utrecht at War
| 
| align=center| 1
| align=center| 4:17
| Utrecht, Netherlands
| 
|-
| NC
| align=center| 2-0 (1)
| Dick Vrij
| No Contest
| Rings Holland: The Final Challenge
| 
| align=center| 1
| align=center| 1:00
| Amsterdam, North Holland, Netherlands
| 
|-
| Win
| align=center| 2-0
| Michael Tielrooy
| Submission (leglock)
| IMA: Battle of Styles
| 
| align=center| 0
| align=center| 0:00
| Netherlands
| 
|-
| Win
| align=center| 1-0
| Richard Anderson
| Submission (guillotine choke)
| BOA: Battle of Amstelveen
| 
| align=center| 1
| align=center| 0:56
| Amstelveen, North Holland, Netherlands
|

See also
List of male mixed martial artists

References

External links
 
 Pedro Palm at mixedmartialarts.com
 Pedro Palm at fightmatrix.com

Dutch male mixed martial artists
Heavyweight mixed martial artists
Living people
Place of birth missing (living people)
Year of birth missing (living people)